Achness Falls, also known as the Achness Waterfall or Cassley Falls, is a waterfall located on the River Cassley in Sutherland, Scotland, near Rosehall and Invercassley. Its name is derived from the Scottish Gaelic Ach-an-eas, the "field of the waterfall".

The falls descend a narrow gorge with the upper fall being a  drop. The location is the type locality and best-studied area of the Achness Thrust, a thrust fault which dips 40 to 50° to the south at the falls. Present nearby are the ruins of a broch and a more modern chapel. By the side of the river is an old cemetery and there are woodland walks.

Atlantic salmon fishing on the River Cassley has a long history. Achness Falls is a temporary barrier to the fish each spring; they do not advance beyond it until the water warms above . In the late 19th century, plans to destroy the waterfall to improve the salmon run were considered.

See also
List of waterfalls of Scotland

References

Bibliography
 

Landforms of Highland (council area)